The Middlebury College Snowbowl is a ski area in Hancock, Vermont,  east of Middlebury in the Green Mountains. The site has been owned and operated by Middlebury College since its first trails were cut in 1934. In 2006, it became the first carbon-neutral ski area in the United States.

History 
One of the second oldest ski areas in Vermont, the Snowbowl has hosted intercollegiate competitions since the 1930s. The original lodge—a traditional log cabin—was built in 1938 and remains the oldest standing base lodge in the nation. A modern lodge, Neil Starr Shelter, a gift of insurance magnate and Stowe Mountain Resort owner Cornelius Vander Starr, was completed in 1962 and completely renovated and expanded in 2004. Along with the Dartmouth Skiway, the Snowbowl is one of two remaining college-owned ski areas in the eastern United States.

The Mountain 
Located on the north slope of Worth Mountain, the Snowbowl rises near Middlebury Gap on land willed to Middlebury College by Joseph Battell in 1915. The property is surrounded by the Joseph Battell Wilderness, land once owned by the College but now part of the Green Mountain National Forest. The mountain features 600+ skiable acres, 100 acres of trails and 500 acres of skiable woods. Averaging  of natural snowfall annually, additional snowmaking covers nearly half of all trails, including most terrain served by the Worth Mountain and Sheehan chairlifts. The Snowbowl's eastern face, colloquially known as "the backside", relies mainly on natural snow and is accessed by the Bailey Falls triple chairlift. In December 2016, a Sun Kid Conveyor was added, for the mountain's youngest skiers.

The Snowbowl is home to the Middlebury College Alpine Ski Team.  A volunteer ski patrol, staffed primarily by students, provides on-mountain medical services. Members are certified as Outdoor Emergency Care technicians and trained in first aid, chairlift evacuation, and toboggan handling. The mountain has also provided a base for local ski racers and supports the local Middlebury Ski Club.

Sustainability 
Middlebury College Snowbowl carries on Middlebury College's commitment to creating a more sustainable world by implementing efficiency and electrification projects in all of their operations. For the Snowbowl, this has included switching to more efficient snow guns, an electric compressor, and installing more efficient lighting in the lodge. The Snowbowl also installed EV chargers during early 2022.

The Snowbowl endeavors to electrify their vehicle fleet with electric snowmobiles and passenger cars. In the future, they are pursuing projects related to composting and renewable energy.

References

External links 
 Middlebury College Snowbowl
 Middlebury College Alpine Ski Team
 Snowbowl Ski Patrol
 First Tracks Report (online magazine)

Ski areas and resorts in Vermont
Middlebury College
Buildings and structures in Addison County, Vermont
Tourist attractions in Addison County, Vermont
Vermont culture